The Smothers Brothers at the Purple Onion, released May 1, 1961 on Mercury Records, is the first album released by the Smothers Brothers and established their reputation as folk music satirists.  The Purple Onion was a celebrated comedy and music club in the North Beach area of San Francisco that also launched the careers of the Kingston Trio and Phyllis Diller, besides the Smothers Brothers. The album's full cover text is: The Songs and Comedy of the Smothers Brothers! Recorded at the Purple Onion, San Francisco, and is Mercury catalog number MG 20611 (monaural), and SR 60611 (stereo). It is sometimes referred to as Live at the Purple Onion.

Despite its title, the bulk of the album was in fact not recorded at the Purple Onion. According to Dick Smothers (quoted in the duo's biography, Dangerously Funny), the Purple Onion shows were good, but the tapes were compromised by technical issues, and as a result the only part of the Purple Onion performance that made it onto the album was the introduction. The majority of the record was in fact sourced from tapes of subsequent performances at the Tideland Club in Houston, Texas, but because the duo was grateful to the Purple Onion for giving them their first break, the album was credited as having been recorded there.

Track listing
All well known songs were rewritten for satiric purposes unless otherwise indicated. Phrases in quotations are from the liner notes.
"Pretoria" (4:26) (Original song credit: Josef Marais) – Made famous by The Weavers as "Marching to Pretoria," new lyrics by Tom (e.g., "You sleep with me, I'll sleep with you").  Also includes a discussion by Tom of marching songs, including "The March from The Bridge on the River Kwai" (to the tune of the "Colonel Bogey March"), whistled in the film due to the lyrics ("The words were dirty").
"Dance, Boatman, Dance" (5:55) (Tom & Dick Smothers)
"Down in the Valley" (4:21) (Tom & Dick Smothers) – a duet based on the Smothers' own arrangement.
"Tzena, Tzena, Tzena, Tzena" (2:11) (Original song credit: M. Parish (original lyric), I. Miron (Michrovsky) (music), & Julius Grossman) – Another song made popular by The Weavers.
"I Wish I Wuz in Peoria" (1:50) (Original song credit: H. Wood, B. Rose & M. Dixon)
"They Call the Wind Maria" (4:23) (Original song credit: Lerner & Loewe) – showtune from Paint Your Wagon.
"Jezebel" (5:42) (Original song credit: Wayne Shanklin) – The Frankie Laine hit with the woman renamed "Mary Ann Johnson"
"I Never Will Marry" (2:48) (Fred Brooks) – Performed as a traditional folk song, no satiric rewrite.  Recorded again with a comic ending on Think Ethnic!.
"Tom Dooley" (4:47) (Tom & Dick Smothers) – based on the song made famous by the Kingston Trio, which Tommy claims the Trio stole from Dick ("Along with his luggage").  They do the "virgin edition," entitled "Tom Crudely."

References

"The Smothers Brothers at the Purple Onion", Mercury Records, 1961 (vinyl monaural recording), MG 20611

External links
Smothers Brothers website/discography

Smothers Brothers albums
1961 live albums
Mercury Records live albums
1961 debut albums